John Reinhardt (1901–1953) was an Austrian actor, screenwriter, and film director. He worked for a number of years in Mexico, where he directed the 1948 American Cold War thriller Sofia. He was married to American screenwriter Elizabeth Reinhardt.

Selected filmography

Actor
 The Climax (1930)
 The Dance Goes On (1930)
 Six Hours to Live (1932)

Director
 El día que me quieras (1935)
 Captain Calamity (1936)
 Tengo fe en ti  (1940)
 The Guilty (1947)
 High Tide (1947)
 For You I Die (1947)
 Sofia (1948)
 Open Secret (1948)
 Chicago Calling (1951)
 Mailman Mueller (1953)
 They Call It Love (1953)

Screenwriter
 The River Pirate (1928)
 Primavera en otoño (1933)
 Nothing More Than a Woman (1934)
 Prescription for Romance (1937)
 Rascals (1938)
 Tower of Terror (1941)

References

Bibliography
 Shapiro, Jerome F. Atomic Bomb Cinema: The Apocalyptic Imagination on Film. Routledge, 2013.

External links

1901 births
1953 deaths
Austrian male screenwriters
Austrian film directors
Austrian male film actors
Film people from Vienna
20th-century Austrian screenwriters
20th-century Austrian male writers